David Carr (born 15 June 1932) is an Australian masters track and field athlete, known for running middle distance races.  He is the current world record holder in the M75 800 metres, the M80 Mile, 2000 metres steeplechase and as a member of the 4x400 metres relay team.  He also has a hand timed result in the M80 800 metres that is superior to the world record but has not been ratified.

Athletic achievements
In the World Masters Athletics Championships, in the 800 metres, Carr has won the gold medal in 1999, 2001, 2003, 2007, 2011, 2013 and 2015.  He took silver behind Janusz Kociszewski in 2008 and 2005, with silvers also in 1987 and 1993.  And he was bronze medalist behind Earl Fee in 1997.  He won the 1500 metres in 1997, 2007, 2013 and 2015, with a silver in 2003 and bronze in 2011. He also won the steeplechase in 2011, 2013 and 2015 after taking silver in 2009.  In the 400 metres he won the world title in 2009, 2013 and 2015 along with a bronze in 1993.

In 2008 and 2009 he was awarded the Brian Foley award by Australian Masters Athletics for the best age graded 800 metre/1500 metre performances in those years.

Carr came in second in worldwide voting for the best masters athlete of 2015.

As perhaps the poster boy for the event, Carr is looking forward to the World Championships coming to his home town of Perth in October 2016.

Carr has been involved in the sport since 1948, with time out for service in the Navy and as a teacher.  He began running in the Masters division in 1974 and went to his first World Championship in 1980.  In local meets he has tried most events in the sport.

References

Living people
1932 births
Australian male middle-distance runners
Australian male steeplechase runners
World record holders in masters athletics